Stephen Beseau (born May 24, 1966) is an American Catholic priest of the Archdiocese of Kansas City who has served as rector and president of the Pontifical College Josephinum since 2019.

Biography 
Beseau was born in Shawnee, Kansas on May 24, 1966, to David and Mary Sue (Sigourney) Beseau. He graduated from Aquinas High School in Overland Park, Kansas in 1984, and earned his bachelors degree in education from the University of Kansas and masters degree in divinity from the University of Saint Mary of the Lake before being ordained a priest for the Archdiocese of Kansas City in June 1995 by Archbishop James Keleher. His first assignment was as associate pastor at St. Ann's in Prairie Village.

Following ordination, Beseau pursued his doctorate at the Pontifical University of Saint Thomas Aquinas in Rome, in 2010 defending a dissertation entitled "Magnanimity as an Interpretive Key for Moral Catechesis of Young Adults", having begun it five years earlier in 2005. He also served as a campus minister and chaplain at the University of Kansas.

In 2016, he was appointed an assistant professor of moral theology at the Athenaeum of Ohio before being appointed the seventeenth rector and president of the Pontifical College Josephinum in March 2019.

References 

1966 births
Living people
People from Kansas City, Missouri
American Catholics
University of Kansas alumni
University of Saint Mary of the Lake alumni
Pontifical University of Saint Thomas Aquinas alumni
People from Shawnee, Kansas